FM 107 Urdu Radio is an Urdu-language radio station in Qatar. It is part of the state-owned Qatar Media Corporation and broadcasts content in Urdu and Hindi for the expatriate audience from the Indian subcontinent residing in Qatar.

An Urdu-language service from Qatar Radio began as an hour-long program, airing at 4 p.m. and moving later to 7 p.m., on the 1062 kHz frequency. The Urdu service slowly grew to broadcast for seven hours a day before becoming a separate station in 2011.

References 

Radio stations in Qatar
Radio stations established in 1980
1980 establishments in Qatar
Hindi-language radio stations
Urdu-language radio stations